Hanazuki may refer to:
 Japanese destroyer Hanazuki (花月)
 Hanazuki, a toy line and media franchise by Hasbro, based on the characters and concepts developed by Hanneke Metselaar and Niko Stumpo
 Hanazuki: Full of Treasures, American animated series by Hasbro Studios